Lake Pleasant may refer to a location in the United States:

Lake Pleasant Regional Park, park in Arizona containing a lake of the same name
Lake Pleasant Camp
Lake Pleasant, Massachusetts, a village
Lake Pleasant Township, Red Lake County, Minnesota
Lake Pleasant, New York, a town
Lake Pleasant (Hamilton County, New York), a lake
Lake Pleasant (hamlet), New York, a community in the town of Lake Pleasant and county seat of Hamilton County
Lake Pleasant (Washington), a lake on the Olympic Peninsula

See also
Pleasant Lake (disambiguation)